The family Caenolestidae contains the seven surviving species of shrew opossum: small, shrew-like marsupials that are confined to the Andes mountains of South America. The order is thought to have diverged from the ancestral marsupial line very early. They were once included in the superorder but it is now known that Ameridelphia is paraphyletic, having given rise to Australidelphia, and thus could be considered an evolutionary grade. Genetic studies indicate that they are the second most basal order of marsupials, after the didelphimorphs. As recently as 20 million years ago, at least seven genera were in South America. Today, just three genera remain. They live in inaccessible forest and grassland regions of the High Andes.

Shrews were entirely absent from South America until the Great American Interchange three million years ago, and are currently present only in the northwestern part of the continent. Traditionally, it was thought that shrew opossums lost ground to these and other placental invaders that fill the same ecological niches. Evidence suggests, however, that both groups not only overlap, but do not seem to be in direct competition, and the marsupials' larger size seems to imply that they prey on shrews and rodents. Several opossums, such as Monodelphis, also occupy small insectivore niches.

Shrew opossums (also known as rat opossums or caenolestids) are about the size of a small rat (9–14 cm long), with thin limbs, a long, pointed snout and a slender, hairy tail. They are largely carnivorous, being active hunters of insects, earthworms, and small vertebrates. They have small eyes and poor sight, and hunt in the early evening and at night, using their hearing and long, sensitive whiskers to locate prey. They seem to spend much of their lives in burrows and on surface runways. Like several other marsupials, they do not have a pouch, and it appears that females do not carry the young constantly, possibly leaving them in the burrow.

Largely because of their rugged, inaccessible habitat, they are very poorly known and have traditionally been considered rare. Several ecological factors, including density of forest, contribute to the part of the forests the shrew opossums occupy. Recent studies suggest they may be more common than had been thought. Their karyotype has also been described through contemporary research in order to better understand this organism.

Classification 

Within the family of the Caenolestidae, seven extant species are known:

 Genus Caenolestes
 Gray-bellied caenolestid, Caenolestes caniventer
 Andean caenolestid, Caenolestes condorensis
 Northern caenolestid, Caenolestes convelatus
 Dusky caenolestid, Caenolestes fuliginosus
 Eastern caenolestid, Caenolestes sangay
 Genus Lestoros
 Peruvian or Incan caenolestid, Lestoros inca
 Genus Rhyncholestes
 Long-nosed caenolestid, Rhyncholestes raphanurus

However, Bublitz suggested in 1987 there were actually two Lestoros and Rhyncholestes species (those listed here plus L. gracilis and R. continentalis). This is, however, not accepted by most scientists.

Fossil species 
Additionally, species from the fossil record are known:

Paleogene 
Eocene
 Perulestes - Pozo Formation, Peru

Barrancan
 Progarzonia notostylopense - Sarmiento Formation, Argentina

Deseadan
 Pseudhalmarhiphus guaraniticus - Sarmiento Formation, Argentina

Neogene 
Colhuehuapian
 Pebas Formation, Amazon Basin
 Caenolestoides miocaenicus Arbello, Martin & Cardoso, 2021 - Sarmiento Formation, Colhue-Huapi Member
 Gaimanlestes pascuali Arbello, Martin & Cardoso, 2021 - Sarmiento Formation, Trelew Member
 Stilotherium parvum Arbello, Martin & Cardoso, 2021 - Sarmiento Formation, Colhue-Huapi Member

Laventan
 Honda Group, Bolivia

Huayquerian
 Pliolestes venetus - Cerro Azul Formation, Argentina

Pliocene
 Umala Formation, Bolivia

Montehermosan
 Pliolestes tripotamicus - Argentina

References 

 
Priabonian first appearances
Marsupials of South America
Mammals of the Andes
Paleogene mammals of South America
Deseadan
Paleogene Argentina
Fossils of Argentina
Paleogene Peru
Fossils of Peru
Neogene mammals of South America
Colhuehuapian
Laventan
Montehermosan
Huayquerian
Neogene Argentina
Neogene Bolivia
Fossils of Bolivia
Quaternary mammals of South America
Mammals described in 1898
Taxa named by Édouard Louis Trouessart